The Slingsby T.59 Kestrel is a British Open class glider which first flew in August 1970. Of fibreglass construction, it features camber-changing flaps, airbrakes, and a retractable main wheel.

Originally a licensed-built version of the Glasflügel 401, the Kestrel was produced in several variants culminating in the T.59H of  wing span. The type was successful when used in gliding competitions and was the first glider to complete a  pre-declared task.

Notable competition use
1970 World Championships - Fourth place, pilot; George Burton.
1972 British National Championships - First place, pilot; John Delafield.
1972 World Championships - Eight Kestrels entered, highest competitors placed fourth (Nick Goodhart) and sixth (Burton).
1975 British National Championships - First place, pilot; George Lee. Eight of the top ten places were taken by Kestrel pilots.

World record use
The 1,000 km out and return pre-declared task world distance record was broken in September 1972 by New Zealander, Dick Georgeson.

Variants
T.59 Kestrel 17
Initial licensed production version of Glasflügel 401, first flown in 1970, five built.
T.59B
Experimental  wing span version, one built.
T.59C Kestrel 19
Prototype with carbon fibre wing spar, first flown in May 1971. One aircraft built.
T.59D/E Kestrel 19
Production Kestrel 19, T.59D was a designation given by the British Gliding Association, T.59E was the designation given to the same type by the Civil Aviation Authority. Over 90 aircraft built.
T.59G Kestrel 22
One aircraft modified in Australia.
T.59H Kestrel 22
Re-designed four-piece wing. Two aircraft built.

Aircraft on display
US Southwest Soaring Museum

Specifications (T.59D Kestrel 19)

See also

References

Notes

Bibliography

 Coates, Andrew. Jane's World Sailplanes and Motorgliders. London. Macdonald and Jane's Publishers Ltd., 1978. 
 Simons, Martin. Slingsby Sailplanes, Shrewsbury, England: Airlife Publishing Ltd. 1996.

External links

 British Gliding Association data sheet - Kestrel 22

1970s British sailplanes
Glider aircraft
Kestrel
Aircraft first flown in 1970
Mid-wing aircraft
T-tail aircraft